Thomas Reilly (born 1942) is a Massachusetts attorney and politician.

Thomas Reilly or Tom Reilly may also refer to:

 Thomas Reilly (footballer) (born 1994), Scottish footballer
 Thomas Reilly (academic) (born 1960), American academic
 Thomas Devin Reilly (1823–1854), Irish revolutionary, Young Irelander and journalist
 Thomas J. Riley or Reilly (1885–1928), U.S. college football coach, Maine
 Thomas L. Reilly (1858–1924), U.S. Representative from Connecticut
 Thomas Reilly (priest) (died 1921), Dean of Ardagh
 Tom Reilly (actor) (born 1959), American actor
 Tom Reilly (author) (born 1960), Irish author
 Tom Reilly (baseball) (1884–1918), American baseball player
 Tommy Reilly (harmonica player) (1919–2000), Canadian harmonica player
 Tommy Reilly (Scottish musician) (born 1989), Scottish singer–songwriter

See also
 Thomas Riley (disambiguation)
 Tom Rielly, Iowa state senator